Fort Stevens, formerly named Fort Massachusetts, was part of the extensive fortifications built around Washington, D.C., during the American Civil War.

Location
The fort was constructed in 1861 as "Fort Massachusetts" and later enlarged by the Union Army and renamed "Fort Stevens" after Brig. Gen. Isaac Ingalls Stevens, who was killed at the Battle of Chantilly, Virginia, on September 1, 1862.
In 1861, it had a perimeter of 168 yards and places for 10 cannon. In 1862, it was expanded to 375 yards and 19 guns.

It guarded the northern approach to Washington, D.C., the Seventh Street Turnpike.  By 1864 Fort Stevens was one part of a thirty-seven mile-long arrangement of fortifications, consisting of sixty-eight forts intended to defend the capital.

Construction
The fort was constructed as a part of a defensive ring around Washington.  Following the Union defeat at Bull Run, Congress voted to augment the city's defenses, which consisted of a single fort (Fort Washington) twelve miles to the south on the Potomac. (Eventually, "68 forts, 93 batteries, 20 miles of rifle pits, and 32 miles of military roads surrounded the capital and Washington became the most heavily fortified city in the world.")

In September 1861 Union troops took possession of a property owned by a free black family Elizabeth Proctor Thomas and her siblings at the Seventh Street Turnpike, seeing it as "an ideal and necessary location for a fort." The soldiers ultimately destroyed her home, barn, orchard, and garden to build what was then named Fort Massachusetts.

Elizabeth Thomas would later often repeat the story that she was watching Union soldiers with a baby in her arms weeping as they destroyed her house when "a tall, slender man dressed in black approached her and said, 'It is hard, but you shall reap a great reward.'"  Many listening to her story held that the man was President Abraham Lincoln.

Thomas would have to fight for compensation for damage and loss of her property and was eventually awarded $1,835 in 1916, a year before her death.

Civil War

After being delayed by the Battle of Monocacy, Maj. Gen. Jubal Early's Confederate forces advanced on Washington, D.C.
The cavalry attacked Fort Stevens in the Battle of Fort Stevens on July 11 and July 12, 1864. They were delayed stealing horses in Damascus, Maryland, and staying overnight near Rockville. 
In response, Major General George Thomas ordered the District of Columbia Militia into the service of the Union army.

On July 11, Confederate sharpshooters successfully shot two of the fort's soldiers, but Union soldiers pushed the Confederate soldiers back to a point  from the fort. The Confederate Army used the house of a nearby resident, Francis Preston Blair, as a headquarters and a makeshift hospital for their wounded. The livestock of several nearby farmers was captured by the Confederate Army. By the evening of July 11, pedestrians lined nearby Seventh Street to watch the fighting. Secretary of State William Seward watched from a carriage.

The Union Army destroyed five nearby houses in order to prevent them being occupied by Confederate sharpshooters; the Union Army allowed the homeowners to remove their furniture before destroying the houses. Despite this, Confederate sharpshooters occupied another home, of Mr. Lay, just west of the fort, and fired shots at Union soldiers from there. Union soldiers responded by firing at the cupola of the house, which caused the Confederate sharpshooters to retreat from it. The house was later burned to the ground. Confederate sharpshooters also fired from Morrison's orchard nearby.

Overnight July 12, the Confederate soldiers retreated from the fort. Confederate soldiers were seen crossing the Potomac River from Poolesville, Maryland, to Virginia. They left behind 101 wounded soldiers, including 11 officers. The total number of Confederate casualties was unknown; the number of Union soldiers killed, wounded, and missing was approximately fifty in number.

According to many accounts, President Abraham Lincoln rode out to the fort on both days to observe the attack, and was briefly under enemy fire by sharpshooters.  On July 12, he was brusquely ordered to take cover, mostly likely by Union Maj. Gen. Horatio Wright. A story has grown up, probably apocryphal, that future Supreme Court Justice Oliver Wendell Holmes Jr., then an aide-de-camp to Wright, yelled at Lincoln, "Get down, you fool!"  Another story attributes this quote to nearby resident Elizabeth Thomas. This is believed to have been only the second time in American history that a sitting president came under enemy fire during a war (the first being President James Madison during the War of 1812). An article published by The Evening Star on July 13 noted, however, that "President Lincoln and Mrs. Lincoln passed along the line of the city defences in a carriage last night, and were warmly greeted by the soldiers wherever they made their appearance amongst them." The article makes no mention of Lincoln coming under fire.

Present day
The site was abandoned after the war. Cass White formed the Fort Stevens Lincoln Memorial Association. A stone memorial was dedicated on November 7, 1911.  In the late 1930s the Civilian Conservation Corps restored a portion of the parapet and one magazine.

The site, near Georgia Avenue at 13th Street and Quackenbos Street NW, is now maintained by the National Park Service Civil War Defenses of Washington. The remains of 41 Union soldiers who died in the Battle of Fort Stevens are buried on the grounds of nearby Battleground National Cemetery.

Further up Georgia Ave, a monument to seventeen unknown Confederate Soldiers was erected in Grace Episcopal Church Cemetery, in Silver Spring, MD. The seventeen soldiers, who died at Fort Stevens, are buried in that cemetery.

See also
 Civil War Defenses of Washington
 Washington, D.C., in the American Civil War
 Bibliography of the American Civil War
 Bibliography of Abraham Lincoln
 Bibliography of Ulysses S. Grant

Notes

References

 Cramer, John Henry, Lincoln Under Enemy Fire, the Complete Account of His Experiences During Early's Attack on Washington, Louisiana, State University Press, 1948; University of Tennessee Press, 2009,

External links 

 The Battle of Fort Stevens: Maps, Histories, Photos, Facts, and Preservation News (CWPT)
Google Maps Aerial View of Fort Stevens
National Park Service page on Fort Stevens
Maureen Dowd column, September 7, 2010 Lincoln’s Forgotten Fort (New York Times, 2010)

1861 establishments in Washington, D.C.
Brightwood (Washington, D.C.)
Stevens
Stevens
Stevens
American Civil War on the National Register of Historic Places